KBS Radio 1 is a South Korean news, talk, sports, Drama and cultural radio channel of the Korean Broadcasting System. The network has a 24-hour broadcast dedicated to today's events reflecting Koreans.

Radio 1's programs are heard nationwide; national shows originate from Seoul, with local stations providing an amount of regional programming (including local identification at the top of the hour and at 4:53 am daily) to its audience.

Stations

Seoul, Incheon, Gyeonggi Province

In other provinces 
 Chuncheon : FM 99.5 MHz, AM 657 kHz
 Wonju : FM 97.1 MHz, FM 95.5 MHz, AM 1152 kHz
 Gangneung : FM 98.9 MHz, AM 864 kHz
 Daejeon : FM 94.7 MHz, AM 882 kHz
 Cheongju : FM 89.3 MHz, AM 1062 kHz
 Chungju : FM 92.1 MHz, 103.3 MHz, FM 90.7 MHz
 Jeonju : FM 96.9 MHz, AM 567 kHz
 Gwangju : FM 90.5 MHz, AM 747 kHz
 Mokpo : FM 105.9 MHz, AM 1467 kHz
 Suncheon : FM 95.7 MHz, AM 630 kHz
 Daegu : FM 101.3 MHz, AM 738 kHz
 Gimcheon : FM 90.7 MHz
 Andong : FM 90.5 MHz, AM 963 kHz
 Pohang : FM 95.9 MHz, AM 1035 kHz
 Busan : FM 103.7 MHz, AM 891 kHz
 Ulsan : FM 90.7 MHz, AM 1449 kHz 
 Changwon : FM 91.7 MHz, AM 1278 kHz
 Jinju : FM 90.3 MHz, AM 1098 kHz
 Jeju : FM 99.1 MHz, AM 963 kHz

Brief history 
Radio 1 was originally launched as Kyeongseong Broadcasting Corporation (JODK) by the Japanese government in Korea on February 16, 1927, and later adopted the callsign HLKA in 1947 after South Korea got the HL callsign block from the International Telecommunication Union. In 1965 the name was changed to KBS Radio 1.

See also 
 KBS Radio 2
 EBS FM
 MBC FM4U
 CBS Music FM
 Traffic Broadcasting System
 EBS 1TV
 Far East Broadcasting Company

References 
 http://www.kbs.co.kr/radio/1radio/index.html

Radio stations in South Korea
Radio 1
Korean-language radio stations
Radio stations established in 1965
Chinese popular culture
South Korean popular culture
News and talk radio stations